Sadou Diallo (born 10 June 1999) is an English professional footballer who plays for Irish club Derry City, as a midfielder.

Early and personal life
Diallo was born in Guinea and grew up in Rotherham, England.

Club career
Diallo began his career with Manchester City at the age of 13, moving to Wolverhampton Wanderers in August 2018. He signed on loan for Accrington Stanley in September 2019. He scored his first professional goal in an EFL Trophy tie against Oldham Athletic on 8 October 2019.

He was released by Wolves at the end of the 2020–21 season.

On 2 July 2021 it was announced that Forest Green Rovers had signed Diallo.

On 15 July 2022, Derry City announced the signing of Diallo on an 18-month contract. Diallo cited Derry player Will Patching, who played with Diallo at Manchester City, as helping convince him to sign for the club.

International career
He has represented England at under-19 youth level.

Career statistics

Honours
Forest Green Rovers
League Two: 2021–22

References

1999 births
Living people
English footballers
English people of Guinean descent
Footballers from Rotherham
Association football midfielders
England youth international footballers
English Football League players
Manchester City F.C. players
Wolverhampton Wanderers F.C. players
Accrington Stanley F.C. players
Forest Green Rovers F.C. players
Derry City F.C. players
Black British sportspeople
League of Ireland players